Love in a Hot Climate is a 1954 Spanish-French drama film directed by Georges Rouquier and Ricardo Muñoz Suay. It was entered into the 1954 Cannes Film Festival.

Cast
 Manuel Aguilera
 Léandre Alpirente
 Rafael Arcos - Paco
 Julia Caba Alba - La tante de Pili
 Christine Carère - Pili
 Mercedes Cora - La Comtesse
 Eugenio Domingo - Federico
 Jacques Dufilho - Chispa
 Félix Fernández - El Chato
 Arnoldo Foà - Riera
 Zsa Zsa Gabor - Marilena
 Daniel Gélin - Ricardo Garcia
 José Guardiola - Manuel
 Manuel Guitián
 Casimiro Hurtado
 Arturo Marín
 Chantal Retz
 Emilio Ruiz de Córdoba
 Emilio Santiago
 José Sepúlveda
 Rico Sevillanito
 Juan Vázquez
 Florence Vernet
 Henri Vilbert - Noguera
 Manuel Zarzo - Nino de Triana

References

External links

1954 films
1954 drama films
1950s French-language films
1950s Spanish-language films
Films directed by Georges Rouquier
Films directed by Ricardo Muñoz Suay
Films with screenplays by Michel Audiard
Spanish multilingual films
French multilingual films
1950s multilingual films
French drama films
Spanish drama films
1950s French films
1950s Spanish films
Spanish-language French films
French-language Spanish films